The population of Ireland in 2021 was approximately seven million with 1,903,100 in Northern Ireland and 5,123,536 in the Republic of Ireland. In the 2022 census the population of the Republic of Ireland eclipsed five million for the first time since the 1851 census. The population of Ireland in 2016 was approximately 6.6 million (4.75 million in the Republic of Ireland and 1.85 million in Northern Ireland). Although these figures demonstrate significant growth over recent years, the population of Ireland remains below the record high of 8,175,124 in the 1841 census.

Between 1700 and 1840, Ireland experienced rapid population growth, rising from less than three million in 1700 to over eight million by the 1841 census. In 1851, as the Great Famine was ending, the population of Ireland had dropped to 6.5 million people. The Famine and the resulting Irish diaspora had a dramatic effect on population; by 1891, Ireland's population had slipped under five million and by 1931, it had dropped to just over four million. It stayed around this level until the 1960s, when the population began to rise again.

Below are some statistics to illustrate the rise, fall and rise again of the population since 1841. The statistics also illustrate a massive population shift from the west to the east of the country and increasing urbanisation. The areas around Dublin and Belfast have seen population growth, while Connacht has become depopulated.

Historical population 

In 2016, the population of Ireland for the first time exceeded the population recorded in the Census of 1851, the first census immediately after the Great Famine, when the population of the island was recorded at 6,575,000.

County populations 2016

Historical populations per province 
(Measured in 1000s, rounded)

Leinster

Munster

Connacht

Ulster 
Figures not in bold are for the Republic of Ireland counties of Ulster only. Figures in bold are for the whole of Ulster.

Historical populations per county 
(Measured in 1000s)

Dublin

Antrim

Down

Cork

Galway

Derry

Kildare

Limerick

Meath

Tyrone

Armagh

Tipperary

Donegal

Wexford

Kerry

Wicklow

Mayo

Louth

Clare

Waterford

Kilkenny

Westmeath

Laois

Offaly

Cavan

Sligo

Roscommon

Fermanagh

Monaghan

Carlow

Longford

Leitrim

See also 
Census of Ireland, 1911
Demographics of the Republic of Ireland
Demography of Northern Ireland
Republic of Ireland Census 2011
Irish diaspora

References

External links 
Historical data at Irish census site

Analysis